Team Parker Racing is a motorsport team based in Leicestershire, in the United Kingdom. Founded in 1997 it has previously competed in Formula Vauxhall Junior, British Formula 3, GT World Challenge Europe, and, more recently, in the British Touring Car Championship, where it is a race-winner, alongside long-term relationships with the Porsche Carrera Cup GB and Caterham.

For 2021 the team will race in the British GT Championship, Porsche Supercup, Porsche Carrera Cup GB, Porsche Sprint Challenge GB, and select Caterham events.

The team partnered with Racing Pride in 2019 to support greater inclusivity across the British motorsport industry for LGBT+ fans, employees and drivers

References

External links
 Team Parker Racing Official Site
 

British auto racing teams
Porsche Supercup teams
Porsche Carrera Cup Great Britain teams
British GT Championship teams
International GT Open teams
Blancpain Endurance Series teams
Auto racing teams established in 1997
British Touring Car Championship teams